Audrey Ethel Bennett, married name Audrey Banfield (born 1 April 1936) is a former British athlete. She competed in the women's high jump at the 1956 Summer Olympics.

She represented England in the high jump at the 1958 British Empire and Commonwealth Games in Cardiff, Wales. She finished in sixth place with a distance of 5'4 (1.62 m) feet.

References

1936 births
Living people
Athletes (track and field) at the 1956 Summer Olympics
British female high jumpers
Olympic athletes of Great Britain
Athletes (track and field) at the 1958 British Empire and Commonwealth Games
Commonwealth Games competitors for England